Prostanthera walteri, commonly known as blotchy mint-bush, is a species of flowering plant that is endemic to south-eastern Australia. It is a sprawling shrub with tangled, hairy branches, egg-shaped leaves and usually bluish green flowers with prominent purple veins arranged singly in leaf axils.

Description
The lower surface of the leaves is hairy and the upper is grooved and more or less glabrous. Flowering occurs in summer.

Taxonomy and naming
Prostanthera walteri was formally described in 1870 by Victorian Government Botanist Ferdinand von Mueller in the seventh volume of Fragmenta Phytographiae Australiae, based on plant material collected by Carl Walter at Mount Ellery in East Gippsland. The specific epithet (walteri) honours the collector of the type specimens.

Distribution and habitat
Blotchy mint-bush occurs on granitic soils in forests in New South Wales south from Mount Imlay to East Gippsland in north-eastern Victoria.

References

walteri
Flora of New South Wales
Flora of Victoria (Australia)
Lamiales of Australia
Taxa named by Ferdinand von Mueller